Dismorphia theucharila, the clearwinged mimic white, is a species of butterfly of the family Pieridae. It is found from Mexico to Bolivia and the Guianas.

The wingspan is 25–27 mm. It exhibits sexual dimorphism.

Subspecies
D. t. theucharila (Venezuela)
D. t. lysinoe (Hewitson, [1853]) (Brazil (Amazonas))
D. t. theonoe (Hewitson, [1853]) (Brazil (Pará), Ecuador)
D. t. fortunata (Lucas, 1854) (Mexico, Panama)
D. t. siloe (Hewitson, [1858]) (Colombia)
D. t. argochloe (Bates, 1861) (Brazil (Amazonas), Bolivia)
D. t. leuconoe (Bates, 1861) (Brazil (Amazonas), Ecuador, Colombia)
D. t. avonia (Hewitson, 1867) (Ecuador, Colombia)
D. t. lysinoides Staudinger, 1884 (Colombia)
D. t. xanthone Röber, 1924 (Colombia)
D. t. vitrea Krüger, 1925 (Surinam, French Guiana)
D. t. elisa Lamas, 2004 (Peru)

Gallery

References

Dismorphiinae
Pieridae of South America
Butterflies of North America
Butterflies described in 1848
Fauna of Brazil
Taxa named by Edward Doubleday